Jessu Jordaar is a 2021 Gujarati-language romantic comedy film directed by Rajan Verma. The film is produced by Shobhna Bhupat Bodar and co-produced by Vrunda Brahmbhatt. The film stars Kuldeep Gor, Bhakti Kubavat, Dhyey Mehta, Rishikesh Ingley, Manoj Joshi, and Supriya Kumari.

Cast 
 Kuldeep Gor 
 Bhakti Kubavat 
 Dhyey Mehta
 Ishikesh Ingley
 Manoj Joshi
 Supriya Kumari
 Nilesh Pandya
 Saloni Raval

Soundtrack

The soundtrack of Jessu Jordaar consists of 2 songs music by Danish Iqbal Sabri and written by Danish Iqbal Sabri.

References

External links
 

2020s Gujarati-language films
Indian romantic comedy films